UFM1 specific peptidase 2 is a protein that in humans is encoded by the UFSP2 gene.

Function

This gene encodes a highly conserved cysteine protease. The protein cleaves two C-terminal residues from ubiquitin-fold modifier 1, a ubiquitin-like post-translational modifier protein. Activation of ubiquitin-fold modifier 1 by the encoded protein exposes a C-terminal glycine residue that allows interaction with other proteins and transfer to its target protein. An allelic variant of this gene has been associated with Beukes hip dysplasia. Alternative splicing results in multiple transcript variants. [provided by RefSeq, Sep 2016].

References

Further reading